Johannes Lamprecht (surname also spelled Lambrecht) (22 August 1922 – 25 August 2008) was a Zimbabwean sports shooter. He competed for Rhodesia in the trap event at the 1964 Summer Olympics.

References

1922 births
2008 deaths
Zimbabwean male sport shooters
Olympic shooters of Rhodesia
Shooters at the 1964 Summer Olympics
Place of birth missing